Peter Lerpiniere (born 3 February 1957) is a male British former swimmer. Lerpiniere competed in the men's 200 metre backstroke at the 1976 Summer Olympics. At the ASA National British Championships he won the 200 metres backstroke title in 1975.

Lerpiniere attended Millfield School from 1971 to 1976. After his swimming career, he worked as an Instructor at Canterbury Christ Church University teaching in the School of Law, Criminal Justice and Computing.

References

1957 births
Living people
British male swimmers
Olympic swimmers of Great Britain
Swimmers at the 1976 Summer Olympics
Place of birth missing (living people)
British male backstroke swimmers
People educated at Millfield